Hamish Watson (born 15 October 1991) is an English professional rugby union player who plays for Edinburgh Rugby in the United Rugby Championship and for the Scotland national rugby union team.

Schoolboy rugby
During his early schooling days at Terra Nova school he won the English schools boys national U13 trophy. He then moved to Oakham School and played for Leicester Tigers Academy until the age of 18.

Professional career
At the start of his English professional career he moved to Oakham in Rutland and was at the Leicester Tigers Academy. On moving to Scotland he then played for Edinburgh Rugby.

International career
Although he was born and raised in England, Watson was eligible to represent Scotland due to his grandfather, who was born in Glasgow, in addition to having lived in Scotland since 2011.

He progressed to a centrally held Scotland 7s contract in the summer of 2011 before being approached to join the Edinburgh Rugby elite development programme, after a string of impressive showings in the back-row.

He made his Scotland Club XV debut in 2013 while still at Edinburgh Academicals.

Scotland national team

After impressing for Edinburgh Rugby, Watson made his international debut in the home defeat to Italy during the 2015 Six Nations Championship.
His first international try came during the Autumn Internationals of November 2016 as Scotland beat Georgia with his second coming the following summer in the impressive victory over Australia in Sydney.

Watson has been a virtual ever-present for Scotland since 2017, garnering numerous Man of the Match awards. Watson was selected in Scotland's squad for the Rugby World Cup in 2019, but suffered a tournament-ending injury in the opening match against Ireland. Watson's outstanding run of form up to and including the 2021 Six Nations Championship, during which he was an ever-present and didn't miss a single tackle during the five matches, saw him ultimately winning the vote for Player of the Championship.

British & Irish Lions

Watson's consistently high standards saw him selected in the 37-man squad for the British & Irish Lions 2021 tour to South Africa. He took to the field for the first tour match against the Sigma Lions at Ellis Park Stadium in Johannesburg, becoming Lion #847. He scored a try within seven minutes and was named man of the match. After performing well in the tour's warm-up matches, he was selected on the substitutes' bench for the first Test, coming on early in the second half as the Lions won 22-17 to lead the series.

International statistics

Personal life

Watson has gained two nicknames from fans: "The Mish", a shortening of his given name, and "Pinball", in reference to his unique running style which sees him bounce off several players over a short distance whilst carrying the ball. The nickname "Pinball" was given to Watson by the Scottish Rugby Podcast.

References

External links
 
Edinburgh Rugby - Hamish Watson

1991 births
Living people
People educated at Oakham School
Scottish rugby union players
Edinburgh Rugby players
Rugby union flankers
Scotland international rugby union players
Scotland Club XV international rugby union players
Scotland international rugby sevens players
Edinburgh Academicals rugby union players
British & Irish Lions rugby union players from England
British & Irish Lions rugby union players from Scotland
Rugby union players from Manchester